Turlington may refer to:

People
 Christy Turlington (born 1969), American supermodel
 Ed Turlington, American lawyer
 Ralph Turlington (1920–2021), American politician

Other
 Turlington Building, Florida, United States
 Turlington Hall, Florida, United States
 Turlington, North Carolina, United States
 Turlington's Balsam, patent medicine